The year 2010 was the 1st year in the history of the  Road FC, an MMA promotion based in South Korea. 2010 started with Road FC 001: The Resurrection of Champions.

List of events

Road FC 001: The Resurrection of Champions 

 Road FC 001: The Resurrection of Championsun was an MMA event held by the Road FC on October 23, 2010, at the Seoul Fashion Center Event Hall in Seoul, South Korea.

Results

See also
 List of Road FC events
 List of Road FC champions
 List of current Road FC fighters
 List of current mixed martial arts champions

References

Road Fighting Championship events
2010 in mixed martial arts
2010 in South Korean sport
2010 in Asian sport